"Ask the Angels" is a rock song written by Patti Smith and Ivan Král, and released as a third single from Patti Smith Group 1976 album Radio Ethiopia. In 2000 The Distillers released a cover of the song on their debut album. Chemical People released a cover on their 1990 EP Angels & Devils.

Notes

External links 
 

1977 singles
Patti Smith songs
Songs written by Patti Smith
Songs written by Ivan Kral
Song recordings produced by Jack Douglas (record producer)
1976 songs
Arista Records singles